Andrew Nesbit Wilson (14 February 1896 – 15 October 1973) was a Scottish footballer who played for Middlesbrough, Heart of Midlothian, Dunfermline Athletic, Chelsea, Queens Park Rangers, Sporting Club Nîmois and the Scotland national team.

Playing career

Middlesbrough and military service
Wilson was born in Newmains, Lanarkshire. He joined Middlesbrough from junior side Cambuslang Rangers in 1914.

His early career was interrupted by the First World War during which his left hand and forearm were shattered by enemy fire at Arras. He wore a glove to mask the withered hand and forearm for the rest of his life.

Heart of Midlothian and Leeds City
Wilson debuted for Heart of Midlothian in January 1918, playing for them until the end of the following season. The Scottish League championship continued to be played during the conflict, and he scored 32 times in 33 official appearances. He also played a handful of league matches for Hamilton Academical.

He guested a couple of times for Leeds City in April 1918, scoring twice on his Peacocks debut at Bradford Park Avenue on 6 April.

Dunfermline Athletic and return to Middlesbrough
In 1919 Wilson joined Dunfermline Athletic when they were part of the rebel Central League, a body outside Scottish Football League jurisdiction. When this league was absorbed by the SFL in 1921, those players previously contracted to a Scottish or English league side were obliged to return to whichever side held their registration as part of the agreement.

Thus Wilson returned to Middlesbrough in time for the 1921–22 season. He ended that season as not just 'Boro's top scorer but also the League's, with 31 strikes.

Chelsea
In November 1923 Wilson joined David Calderhead's sizeable contingent of Scots at Chelsea mid-season for £6,500. He was replaced at Middlesbrough the following month with Ian Dickson from Aston Villa for £3,000. Wilson ended the 1923–24 season as both Middlesbrough and Chelsea's top scorer; both clubs were relegated from the top flight that season.

He made 253 appearances for Chelsea and scored 52 goals in the next eight years. In that time he lined up beside compatriots such as Willie Ferguson, Tommy Law, Hughie Gallacher, Alex Jackson and Alec Cheyne.

Queens Park Rangers, Nimes
He joined Queens Park Rangers in 1931, scoring three times in 20 league games, then spent a two-season sojourn in France with Sporting Club Nîmes.

International
When at Dunfermline and Middlesbrough, Wilson was capped 12 times by Scotland between 1920 and 1923; he averaged more than a goal per game with 13 goals. He scored another four in two unofficial wartime internationals.

Ten of his Scotland goals, across nine matches, helped the nation to win the British Home Championship three times in a row between 1920–21 and 1922–23.

Managerial and coaching
In 1934 he became Walsall manager. He then accepted a series of coaching positions, including at Chelsea and Gravesend and Northfleet, where he was the club's first manager following their formation in 1946. He spent the 1946–47 season at Gravesend before departing.

Personal life
Wilson was a keen lawn bowler and reached the final of the 1945 National Championship triples.

His younger son, Jimmy, survived a tour as a tail-gunner in the far east during World War II. Jimmy played for Watford after the war.

International goals
Scores and results list Scotland's goal tally first, score column indicates score after each Wilson goal.

See also
List of Scotland national football team captains
List of Scotland wartime international footballers
List of Scottish football families

References

External links 

London Hearts profile
Chelsea FC 'former key player' profile
Profile at Mighty Leeds

1896 births
1973 deaths
Scottish footballers
Scotland international footballers
Scotland wartime international footballers
Scottish expatriate footballers
Scottish Football League players
English Football League players
First Division/Premier League top scorers
Hamilton Academical F.C. wartime guest players
Heart of Midlothian F.C. wartime guest players
Leeds City F.C. wartime guest players
Dunfermline Athletic F.C. players
Cambuslang Rangers F.C. players
Middlesbrough F.C. players
Chelsea F.C. players
Queens Park Rangers F.C. players
Walsall F.C. managers
Chelsea F.C. non-playing staff
Expatriate footballers in France
Association football forwards
British Army personnel of World War I
Scottish Junior Football Association players
Sportspeople from Wishaw
People from Newmains
Scottish football managers
Sportsmen with disabilities
Footballers from North Lanarkshire